Dudua brachytoma is a moth of the family Tortricidae. It is found in Thailand and Java.

The wingspan is 16 mm. The forewings are dark, dull purplish-fuscous grey with faint bluish and purplish reflections. The hindwings are fuscous bronze, becoming slightly paler greyish towards the base.

References

Moths described in 1973
Olethreutini